Bumburet (Kalasha:) is the largest valley of Kalasha Desh in Lower Chitral District, Khyber Pakhtunkhwa the province of Pakistan.

The valley is inhabited by the Kalash people, and has become a tourist destination. However, their population is rapidly declining. As of 2019, only 37 households existed in the valley that still followed traditional practices.

References

Kochetov, A., Arsenault, P., Petersen, J., Kalas, S., & Kalash, T. (2020). Kalasha (Bumburet variety). Journal of the International Phonetic Association, 1-22. doi:10.1017/S0025100319000367

Naeem, H., Rana, A., R., & Sarfarz, N. (June 2011). Attitude Measurement and Testing: An Empirical Study of Kalash People in Pakistan. INTERDISCIPLINARY JOURNAL OF CONTEMPORARY RESEARCH IN BUSINESS, vol 3, No 2.

External links 

Populated places in Chitral District
Hill stations in Pakistan
Kalasha Valleys
Valleys of Khyber Pakhtunkhwa